Thiago Jotta da Silva (14 February 1983 – 24 September 2008) was a Brazilian footballer who played for Estácio de Sá (at the time of his death) and Vasco de Gama.

Death
On 24 September 2008, Silva died at the Salgado Filho Hospital in the Méier area in Rio de Janeiro six days after receiving mortal wounds from a kidnapping and torture incident. Police arrested Silva's ex-girlfriend, Aline de Pádua (also written as Alyne Padula), and Padula's aunt, Márcia Pádua Viana (also written as Marcia Padula Viana), in connection with the crime. Three men, including a member of the military police, were friends of Márcia Pádua. The men shot Thiago Jotta da Silva when he tried to escape the attackers, he was 25.

See also
List of kidnappings

References

1983 births
2008 deaths
Association footballers not categorized by position
Brazilian footballers
Brazilian murder victims
Deaths by firearm in Brazil
Kidnapped Brazilian people
Male murder victims
People murdered in Rio de Janeiro